Felix Rosenqvist (born 7 November 1991) is a Swedish professional racing driver who currently drives the No. 6 Chevrolet for Arrow McLaren in the NTT IndyCar Series. He was named Rookie of the Year for the IndyCar Series in 2019.

Racing career

Formula Renault
Rosenqvist started his single-seater career in Asia, he won the 2008 Formula Renault 2.0 Asia and 2009 Formula Renault 2.0 Sweden/NEZ titles.

German Formula 3 Championship
In 2010 he was fifth in the German Formula Three Championship with two victories, eight podiums, and one pole position. He also attended the 2010 Macau Grand Prix Formula Three where he finished ninth after having qualified seventh in his debut with the same Swedish/British racing team Performance Racing.

European Formula 3 Championship
For 2011, he graduated to the Formula 3 Euro Series with the Mücke Motorsport team, where he finished fifth with one win, 10 podiums, and five fastest laps, and won the Masters of Formula 3 in his rookie year.

In 2012 he finished third in the 2012 European Formula 3 Championship and finished second in Macau Grand Prix.

The year after he narrowly missed out on the 2013 European Formula 3 Championship title to Raffaele Marciello, however winning the Masters of Formula 3 for a second time from pole position. In Macau Grand Prix he started the race from the front row but collided with Raffaele Marciello and Pipo Derani to retire in the first lap.

In his fourth year with Mücke Motorsport, the Swede finished eighth in the 2014 European Formula 3 Championship in a disappointing campaign. He ended the year with a very welcomed win in the 2014 Macau Grand Prix from pole position ahead of teammate Lucas Auer

In 2015 he switched to Prema Powerteam, claiming the 2015 European Formula 3 Championship title with 13 victories, 24 podiums, and 17 pole positions. He would also take his second consecutive victory in the 2015 Macau Grand Prix, again from pole position. His extended Formula 3 career meant that he would become the most successful Formula 3 racer of all time.

Indy Lights
In February 2016 he announced that he would compete in the 2016 Indy Lights series for Belardi Auto Racing as he failed to bring the budget for a continued programme in GP2 Series with Prema Powerteam. Rosenqvist had a reduced programme in the series, competing in only 10 of the 18 races, as he later in the season would have clashing commitments with his sportscar programme with Mercedes-Benz in Europe. He scored 3 wins in his campaign. He had a successful test in IndyCar with Chip Ganassi Racing at Mid-Ohio Sports Car Course, saying he would be happy to return to the American racing scene later in his career.

GT Racing
Rosenqvist joined the 2016 Blancpain GT Series Sprint Cup together with French Tristan Vautier, driving a Mercedes-AMG GT3 for AKKA-ASP Team where they together scored 1 victory, 3 podiums out of the 10 races and finished 7th in the overall standings. The same duo together with Renger van der Zande lined up for the classic 2016 24 Hours of Spa where they reached 2nd place after all Mercedes-Benz cars have been given a 5-minute stop and go penalty.

DTM
Rosenqvist started 2016 with a role as official reserve driver, having continued his long partnership with Mercedes-Benz before being promoted to a race seat with one of the cars run by ART Grand Prix following Esteban Ocon's departure to Manor Racing in Formula One. He made an impressive debut in Moscow where he finished 10th and scored points in his first-ever race in the Deutsche Tourenwagen Masters.

Formula E

On 22 August 2016, it was announced that Rosenqvist would partner former Formula One driver Nick Heidfeld at the Mahindra Formula E team for the 2016–17 Formula E season. On 10 June 2017, he won the first race at the  Berlin ePrix. It would be the first victory for him, as well as for his team. At the end of 2018, he made his last race start in Formula E before moving on to the Indy Car Series.

Street circuits
Rosenqvist is known to be a street circuit specialist having won in Grand Prix of St. Petersburg, Honda Indy Toronto, Grand Prix de Pau, Norisring and Macau Grand Prix twice, where he has started 7 times from the front row.

Super Formula
Rosenqvist raced in the Super Formula series for the 2017 season with Team LeMans. The same team that his manager Stefan Johansson raced with in Japanese F2 in 1981.

Super GT 
Rosenqvist raced in the Super GT series for the 2018 season with Team LeMans, the same team he raced in the Super Formula series the year before. He replaced Andrea Caldarelli's position in the team.

IndyCar Series 

Rosenqvist signed with Chip Ganassi Racing for the 2019 IndyCar Series. He went on to win Rookie of the Year honors after finishing sixth in the championship standings.
In the 2020 season, Rosenqvist won his first IndyCar race at the REV Group Grand Prix at Road America.

On 13 October 2020 it was announced Rosenqvist would leave the team and join Arrow McLaren SP in 2021, replacing Oliver Askew in the organization's No. 7 entry.

On 12 June 2021, at the first of the Chevrolet Detroit Grand Prix weekend doubleheader, Rosenqvist suffered a significant crash on lap 28 as his #7 Arrow McLaren car experienced a stuck throttle and as a result, his car crashed hard into the wall.  He did not suffer any life-threatening injuries but was taken to a downtown Detroit hospital for further evaluation. Rosenqvist was released the following day from the hospital but was not cleared to participate in the second Detroit race nor the following round at Road America a week later. He was replaced in said races by Oliver Askew and Kevin Magnussen respectively, with Magnussen making his IndyCar debut.

He stayed with McLaren for 2022, and picked up his first podium with the team at Toronto. It was announced in September that he would also be driving for the team in 2023.

Racing record

Career summary

† As Rosenqvist was a guest driver, he was ineligible for points.

Complete Formula 3 Euro Series results
(key)

Complete FIA Formula 3 European Championship results
(key)

American open-wheel racing results

Indy Lights

IndyCar Series
(key)

* Season still in progress.

Indianapolis 500

Complete Blancpain GT Series Sprint Cup results

Complete Deutsche Tourenwagen Masters results
(key) (Races in bold indicate pole position) (Races in italics indicate fastest lap)

Complete Formula E results
(key) (Races in bold indicate pole position; races in italics indicate fastest lap)

† Driver did not finish the race but was classified as he completed more than 90% of the race distance.

Complete Super Formula results
(Races in bold indicate pole position)

24 Hours of Le Mans results

Complete IMSA SportsCar Championship

† Rosenqvist did not complete sufficient laps in order to score full points.

24 Hours of Daytona

Complete Super GT results

References

External links

 
 

1991 births
Living people
People from Värnamo Municipality
Swedish racing drivers
Formula Renault 2.0 NEC drivers
Asian Formula Renault Challenge drivers
German Formula Three Championship drivers
Formula Palmer Audi drivers
Sweden Formula Renault 2.0 drivers
Formula Renault 2.0 NEZ drivers
Formula 3 Euro Series drivers
FIA Formula 3 European Championship drivers
IndyCar Series drivers
Indy Lights drivers
ADAC GT Masters drivers
Deutsche Tourenwagen Masters drivers
Formula E drivers
24 Hours of Le Mans drivers
WeatherTech SportsCar Championship drivers
24 Hours of Daytona drivers
Super Formula drivers
Indianapolis 500 drivers
Prema Powerteam drivers
Performance Racing drivers
Mücke Motorsport drivers
Belardi Auto Racing drivers
ART Grand Prix drivers
Mahindra Racing drivers
Team LeMans drivers
Chip Ganassi Racing drivers
Arrow McLaren SP drivers
Sportspeople from Jönköping County
Italian Formula Renault 2.0 drivers
Blancpain Endurance Series drivers
Porsche Supercup drivers
Starworks Motorsport drivers
DragonSpeed drivers
Jota Sport drivers
Campos Racing drivers
Finland Formula Renault 2.0 drivers
Mercedes-AMG Motorsport drivers
Porsche Motorsports drivers